Prospect Township is one of the fifteen townships of Marion County, Ohio, United States.  The 2010 census found 2,089 people in the township, 1,112 of whom lived in the village of Prospect.

Geography
Located in the southern part of the county, it borders the following townships:
Pleasant Township - northeast
Waldo Township - east
Marlboro Township, Delaware County - southeast corner
Radnor Township, Delaware County - south, east of Thompson Township
Thompson Township, Delaware County - south, west of Radnor Township
Claibourne Township, Union County - southwest
Jackson Township, Union County - west
Green Camp Township - northwest

The village of Prospect is located in southern Prospect Township.

Name and history
It is the only Prospect Township statewide.

Government
The township is governed by a three-member board of trustees, who are elected in November of odd-numbered years to a four-year term beginning on the following January 1. Two are elected in the year after the presidential election and one is elected in the year before it. There is also an elected township fiscal officer, who serves a four-year term beginning on April 1 of the year after the election, which is held in November of the year before the presidential election. Vacancies in the fiscal officership or on the board of trustees are filled by the remaining trustees.

References

External links
County website

Townships in Marion County, Ohio
Townships in Ohio